The Davis-Proctor House in Twin City in Emanuel County, Georgia is a Late Victorian house built in 1890.

It is a contributing property to the NRHP-listed Twin City Historic District.

It is a one-and-a-half-story frame "Folk Victorian" or Georgian cottage with a wraparound porch with decorative brackets and spindle work, as well as turned posts.  It has multiple gables with decorative shingles.

References

Houses on the National Register of Historic Places in Georgia (U.S. state)
Houses completed in 1890
Victorian architecture in Georgia (U.S. state)
National Register of Historic Places in Emanuel County, Georgia
Individually listed contributing properties to historic districts on the National Register in Georgia (U.S. state)
Houses in Emanuel County, Georgia
1890 establishments in Georgia (U.S. state)